Kucch To Hai is a 2003 Indian Hindi-language slasher film written by Rajeev Jhaveri and directed by Anurag Basu and Anil V. Kumar. The film stars Tusshar Kapoor, Esha Deol, Anita Hassanandani,  Yash Tonk, Rishi Kapoor, Jeetendra and Moonmoon Sen. The film was produced under the banner of Balaji Motion Pictures. It was inspired by an Urban Legend (1998) and is an unofficial remake of the Hollywood slasher film I Know What You Did Last Summer (1997) and inspired from Scream series.

Plot 
Karan (Tusshar Kapoor) and Natasha (Anita Hassanandani) are childhood friends. Natasha has always loved Karan, albeit secretly and wanted to marry him. Karan, however, falls for Tanya (Esha Deol), the new admission in college. Meanwhile, Professor Bakshi (Rishi Kapoor), who is rumoured to have murdered his wife and hidden her body, is reinstated at the college. When Karan falls for Tanya, a playboy named Yash (Yash Tonk) befriends him and helps his way through Tanya's heart. To impress Tanya, Karan promises her that he will steal the exam answers from Professor Bakshi's house so that Tanya would pass easily.

Together Karan, Natasha and Yash along with two other friends, Pat and Kush, sneak inside Professor Bakshi's house to retrieve the exam papers so Tanya's year won't be a waste. When they find a woman's dead body there, they try to run away but are chased by Professor Bakshi. Their car accidentally hits Professor Bakshi and he falls down the cliff. Fearing arrest, they run away. Tanya is traumatized by these events, and leaves to start a new life.

Years later, Tanya, Karan and their group have a reunion at the wedding of one of their friends. However, a killer is lurking somewhere nearby and is waiting to strike. And one by one they start to die: Dolly, Pat and Kush are all killed, while Yash is attacked, but miraculously survives. Eventually, only three are left.

When Yash is attacked again, Karan follows who appears to be Professor Bakshi, only to find someone else being attacked while Bakshi is with him. He leaves to find Khush attacked, and Khush says "Tanya" as he holds a piece of red fabric.

Karan follows a car which has Natasha and Tanya in it to a cliff, and finds Natasha injured. She tells him that Professor Bakshi had brought her and Tanya here. Karan realises she is lying, as Professor Bakshi was with him, and also realises the piece of fabric Khush had in his hand came off Natasha's scarf. He asks Natasha why she attacked everyone, and she claims it because she loved him. She begs him to forgive her, but he is speechless. She says that after finding this out, he won't forgive her, so she walks backwards in the snow and falls off the edge, yelling Karan's name. He runs to save her, but is unsuccessful, and her scarf blows into his face.

On the first day of college, Karan remembers each of his friends who died, including Natasha. While on the plane back to Delhi, he meets Tanya again, and they decide to be with each other, while they find Yash in the back seat.

Cast 
 Tusshar Kapoor as Karan 
 Esha Deol as Tanya Oberoi
 Rishi Kapoor as Professor Bakshi
 Johnny Lever as Popatlal
 Anita Hassanandani as Natasha aka Tashu 
 Vrajesh Hirjee as Pat
 Yash Tonk as Yash
 Manoj Pahwa as Professor Bhalla; Dolly's father
 Moon Moon Sen as Madam Saxena
 Jeetendra as  Ravi, Karan's father
Kusumit Sana as Dolly
Akshay as Kush

Reception 
The film's reviews were generally unfavorable, the film was declared a flop by boxofficeindia.com. Critic Taran Adarsh gave it 1.5 star out of 5 and commented: "A poor remake of the Hollywood flick I Know What You Did Last Summer, Kucch To Hai hardly offers much to the audience with a few chills and thrills."

Tusshar Kapoor denied that they copied I Know What You Did Last Summer and said he did not see the original film yet.

Times of India gave it 2.5 stars out of five .

Music 

The film's soundtrack contains 8 songs, all composed by Anu Malik and written by Sameer. According to the Indian trade website Box Office India, with around 9,00,000 units sold, this film's soundtrack album was the year's fourteenth highest-selling.

See also 
 List of Bollywood thriller films
I Know What You Did Last Summer (franchise)

References

External links 

2003 films
2003 horror films
2000s Hindi-language films
2000s buddy films
Films scored by Anu Malik
Indian buddy films
Indian slasher films
Indian romantic horror films
Indian romantic thriller films
Balaji Motion Pictures films
Indian horror film remakes
Indian remakes of American films
2003 directorial debut films
2000s romantic thriller films
2000s slasher films
Films directed by Anurag Basu